Frank Caruso may refer to:

 Frank T. Caruso (1911–1983), Chicago mobster 

 Frank Caruso (chemical engineer), professor at the University of Melbourne, Australia